Paradidymocentrus maindroni is a species of beetle in the family Cerambycidae. It was described by Breuning in 1978.

References

Acanthocinini
Beetles described in 1978